PlayFirst, Inc. is a Delaware  based publisher of casual games founded in 2004 by industry veterans. PlayFirst produced the Diner Dash series, which won the 2008 Annual Casual Game Awards. and has seen over 550 million downloads. The popularity of Diner Dash series prompted spin-off series like Wedding Dash and Cooking Dash. The company’s game portfolio also includes the retro-style strategy-based Chocolatier series, and the adventure/hidden object-mixing Dream Chronicles series.

From 2005 to mid-2011, PlayFirst have released 72 casual games for PC and Mac, counting extra 7 Collector's Editions and Strategy Guides, thus they have 79 games in total in their game categories.

History

2004–2010: Early days, breakthrough, and maintaining the success of Dash series 
PlayFirst’s biggest commercial success was its first game, Diner Dash, which was released for the first time on PC/Mac platforms in late 2004. Diner Dash was initially developed by Gamelab, a New York-based casual game developer, under a multi-title publishing agreement with PlayFirst. The success of Diner Dash with game critics and gamers prompted PlayFirst to release four sequels in the following years: Restaurant Rescue (2006), Flo on the Go (2006), Hometown Hero (2007), and the fifth BOOM! in 2010.

PlayFirst has also published Diner Dash across multiple platforms, including PC, Mac, iPhone, iPad, Facebook and consoles DS, Xbox, and Wii. PlayFirst games are available on more than 500 sites in 20 languages.

Spin-off series and games Wedding Dash (2007), Cooking Dash (2008), and Hotel Dash (2009) were released. However, they mostly earned lukewarm receptions from game critics and gamers.

Other non-Dash PlayFirst games includes the three-part, retro-style strategy-based Chocolatier series, which was released during 2007 and 2009 in collaboration with Big Splash Games. The five-part, adventure/hidden object-mixing Dream Chronicles series was another highlight in PlayFirst's portfolio.  Dream Chronicles was released during 2007 and 2011 in collaboration with KatGames.

2010–2015: Cancellation of releasing on PC/Mac and new direction 

In October 2010, PlayFirst announced a focus on the mobile and social market after raising $9.2 million from investors, and cancelled releasing further casual games in the near future. PlayFirst's forays into the social gaming market have proven unsuccessful, as low user counts forced the company to cancel all of its Facebook games, Diner Dash and Chocolatier, not long after launching them.

As of late 2010, the company employed more than 100 workers, but laid off an unspecified number of its employees in early December 2011 due to "restructuring". Other social games veterans who joined the company in late 2010 from Playdom and Zynga have also left; however, PlayFirst claims the layoffs will not change its emphasis on the mobile market.

On October 8, 2012, PlayFirst emailed its subscribers informing them that the company will cease the production of PC and Mac games and move to a new website since November 12, 2012. The email read, "We have established a firm position as one of the leading producers for iOS mobile applications and are currently working on implementing our games into the Android marketplace," and that current games in its catalogue will still be available for purchase on the third party websites like Big Fish Games and GameHouse.

On September 3, 2014, PlayFirst was acquired by Glu Mobile. The official statement from Glu Mobile CEO, Niccolo de Masi, read "We are pleased to officially add PlayFirst to the Glu family and look forward to delivering new DASH products to a worldwide audience,"

Published and/or co-developed on PC/Mac platforms

2011 

 Hotel Dash 2: Lost Luxuries
 Dream Chronicles: The Book of Water (+ Collector's Edition & Strategy Guide)
 Garden Dash
 Murder Island: Secret of Tantalus
 Dream Chronicles: The Book of Fire (CANCELLED)

2010 
 Tamara the 13th
 Soap Opera Dash
 Avenue Flo: Special Delivery
 Cooking Dash 3: Thrills and Spills (+ Collector's Edition)
 Escape from Frankenstein's Castle 
 Wedding Dash: 4-Ever
 The Fifth Gate
 Dream Chronicles: The Book of Air (+ Collector's Edition & Strategy Guide)
 Love and Death: Bitten
 The Palace Builder
 Diner Dash 5: BOOM! (+ Collector's Edition & Strategy Guide)
 Alice's Tea Cup Madness

2009 
 Gotcha: Celebrity Secrets
 Hotel Dash: Suite Success
 Valerie Porter and the Scarlet Scandal
 Avenue Flo
 Gemini Lost
 Cooking Dash: DinerTown Studios
 Passport to Perfume
 DinerTown Detective Agency
 Wedding Dash: Ready, Aim, Love!
 DinerTown Tycoon
 Dream Chronicles: The Chosen Child
 Wandering Willows
 Diaper Dash
 Emerald City Confidential
 Chocolatier: Decadence by Design

2008 
 Nightshift Legacy: The Jaguar's Eye
 Fitness Dash
 Daycare Nightmare: Mini-Monsters
 Parking Dash
 Cooking Dash
 The Great Chocolate Chase: A Chocolatier Twist	
 Fashion Dash	
 Wedding Dash 2: Rings Around the World	
 Dairy Dash	
 Pet Shop Hop
 Dream Chronicles 2: The Eternal Maze
 Doggie Dash

2007 
 The Nightshift Code
 Dress Shop Hop
 Chocolatier 2: Secret Ingredients
 Diner Dash: Hometown Hero
 Diner Dash: Flo Through Time
 Diner Dash: Seasonal Snack Pack
 Mahjong Roadshow
 Daycare Nightmare
 Wedding Dash
 SpongeBob Diner Dash: 2 Times the Trouble
 Dream Chronicles
 Zenerchi
 Chocolatier
 Mystery of Shark Island

2006 
 Diner Dash: Flo on the Go
 SandScripts
 Sweetopia
 SpongeBob Diner Dash
 Poker Pop
 Diner Dash 2: Restaurant Rescue
 Plantasia
 Pirate Poppers
 Egg vs. Chicken
 Tasty Planet

2005 
 Professor Fizzwizzle 
 TriJinx
 Chessmaster Challenge
 Diner Dash
 Subway Scramble
 Spellagories

Published and/or co-developed on iOS platforms 
 Chocolatier: Decadence by Design
 Cloudy with a Chance of a Meatballs 2: Foodimal Frenzy (no longer available on App Store)
 Cooking Dash
 Cooking Dash: Thrills and Spills
 Diner Dash
 Diner Dash: Grilling Green
 DinerTown Pets
 DinerTown Zoo
 Dream Chronicles
 Dream Chronicles: The Book of Air
 Dream Chronicles: The Book of Water
 Egg vs. Chicken (no longer available on App Store)
 Hotel Dash / Hotel Dash Deluxe
 Hotel Dash 2: Lost Luxuries
 Hotel Transylvania Dash (no longer available on App Store)
 Love & Death: Bitten
 Parking Dash
 Soap Opera Dash
 Wedding Dash
 Wedding Dash 4-Ever

Playground SDK 
Playground SDK is PlayFirst's game engine. It is discontinued.

References

External links
 Official Website
 PlayFirst company profile from MobyGames

Browser-based game websites
Video game companies established in 2004
Video game publishers
Electronic Arts